The second season of Esta historia me suena (shown on screen as Esta historia me suena: Vol. 2) aired from 18 December 2019 to 22 March 2020 on Las Estrellas. The season is produced by Genoveva Martínez and Televisa. The season consists of fifteen one-hour episodes. The episodes are named after classic songs. Filming of the season began on 16 August 2019. The entire season is available via streaming on Blim TV.

Each episode of the second season is presented by the singer María José.

Notable guest stars 

 Ana Bertha Espín
 Rossana San Juan
 Erik Díaz
 Carmen Madrid
 Moisés Arizmendi
 Diana Golden
 Hernán Mendoza
 Sharis Cid
 Francisco de la O
 Margarita Magaña
 Luz Elena González
 Raquel Olmedo
 Arleth Terán
 Queta Lavat

Episodes

Notes

References 

2019 Mexican television seasons
2020 American television seasons